These are the results (medal winners) of the swimming competition at the 1991 World Aquatics Championships.

Medal table

Medal summary

Men

Legend: WR – World record; CR – Championship record

Women

Legend: WR – World record; CR – Championship record

References
 1991 World Aquatics Championships-results
HistoFINA Men
HistoFINA Women

Swimming
Swimming at the World Aquatics Championships
1991 in swimming